Pefkari (Greek: Πευκάρι) is a village on the island of Thasos, Greece. It is a popular tourist destination.

Its name means "little pine tree" in the local dialect. It lies on the southern coast of the island, between the villages of Potos and Limenaria.

References

External links
 Visit Thassos

Populated places in Thasos